Leadbelly Sings Folk Songs is a remastered compilation album of American folk songs sung by legend Leadbelly accompanied by Woody Guthrie, Cisco Houston, and Sonny Terry, originally recorded by Moses Asch in the 1940s and re-released in 1989 by Folkways Records.

Critical reception
The Penguin Guide to Blues Recordings called it a "good LP," but one that has been superseded by superior reissues.

Track listing

All track information and credits were taken from the CD liner notes.

References

1990 compilation albums
Lead Belly albums
Folkways Records albums